MPD may refer to:

Police

U.S. police
 Memphis Police Department, Memphis, Tennessee
 Metropolitan Police Department of the District of Columbia, Washington, District of Columbia
 Miami Police Department, Miami, Florida
 Milwaukee Police Department, Milwaukee, Wisconsin
 Minneapolis Police Department, Minneapolis, Minnesota

Other police
 Manila Police District, Manila, the Philippines
 Metropolitan Police District, the area policed by the Metropolitan Police Service in London, United Kingdom
 Montreal Police Department, Montreal, Canada
 Tokyo Metropolitan Police Department, Tokyo, Japan

Politics
 Movement for Democracy (Cape Verde), a political party in Cape Verde
 Movimiento Popular Democrático, a political party in Ecuador

Science
 Magnetoplasmadynamic thruster, an electric space propulsion engine
 Mesoscale precipitation discussion, a short-term meteorological forecast issued by the Weather Prediction Center concerning heavy precipitation and flash flooding
 Multivariate Pólya distribution, a statistical distribution
 Mouse Phenome Database, an online database of laboratory mouse characterizations

Chemistry
 2-Methyl-2,4-pentanediol
 m-Phenylenediamine
 Methylphenidate

Medicine
 Multiple personality disorder, a mental condition
 Myeloproliferative disease, a group of diseases of the bone marrow
 Maximum permissible dose, of radiation

Software
 MPD (programming language), a concurrent programming language
 Music Player Daemon, a music-player server
 Media Presentation Description, segment information in the streaming technique Dynamic Adaptive Streaming over HTTP (DASH)

Other uses
 Managed Pressure Drilling, an adaptive oil drilling process
 Markovian Parallax Denigrate, a 1996 internet mystery.
 Memory Protection Devices, a company that manufactures battery holders
 UTA MPD, a type of diesel multiple unit railcar of Northern Ireland Railways
 Air Comet, by ICAO airline designator
 Motive power depot, a location used to store locomotives
 A range of MIDI pad controllers made by Akai
 Metres above principal datum (mPD), a surveying term; see sea level